Surp Khach Monastery ('Monastery of the Holy Cross') is a medieval Armenian monastery located on the Crimean peninsula near Staryi Krym and founded in 1358. Before the USSR nationalized it, this monastery owned 4,000 acres of land, while during the Soviet period it served various functions from Pioneer Camp to tuberculosis clinic. It has been an Armenian spiritual center and a place of pilgrimage for centuries.

It's also the name of the Armenian Cathedral of the Holy Cross, in Lake Van, Turkey.

The central bank of Russia issued a silver coin dedicated to Surp Khach Monastery in 2017.

Gallery

References

Armenian Apostolic monasteries
Christian monasteries in Ukraine
1358 establishments in Europe
Tourist attractions in Crimea
Armenian Apostolic churches in Ukraine
Cultural heritage monuments of federal significance in Crimea